John Alexander Rennie (born 29 July 1970) is a former Zimbabwean cricketer who played in four Test matches and 44 One Day Internationals (ODIs) from 1993 to 2000. He played as a swing bowler for the Zimbabwe national side between 1993 and 2000.

Early life
Rennie was born at Fort Victoria in what was then Rhodesia in 1970 and was educated in Salisbury. He attended Hartmann House Preparatory School and then St George's College where he was coached by Robin Stokes and Bill Flower. After playing in the school XI, he joined Old Georgians Cricket Club and played for Zimbabwean representative sides, including the national under-24 side.

Cricket career
A swing bowler who was able to move the ball in the air and bowl in a controlled way, Rennie made his international debut in 1993, playing in all four of Zimbabwe's matches in the 1993 Hero Cup series of ODIs in India, including in the tied match against India when he was the not out batsman as Zimbabwe almost won the match. He made his Test debut later the same year during Zimbabwe's tour of Pakistan, taking the wicket of Shoaib Mohammad on debut. He went on to play for Zimbabwe mainly in one-day cricket, making 44 ODI appearances and playing in only four Test matches before his international career ended in 2000. Ward considers that he was able to succeed largely through hard work and application rather than natural talent.

In domestic cricket, Rennie played for Matabeleland in the Logan Cup between 1993/94 and 2000/01, bowling his side to success in the 1995/96 cup final. He captained the side in several matches during 1996/97 but his career in the storage industry and family commitments cut his cricket career short and Rennie played his final senior matches in 2000/01. He served on the national selection panel for a period, but was removed following Zimbabwe's disappointing performances in the 2011 Cricket World Cup.

Family
Rennie's younger brother, Gavin, also played for Zimbabwe, the pair playing in the same Test team in 1997, John Rennie's final Test match. This was the first time that three sets of brothers had played for the same side in the same Test match, the Rennie brothers playing alongside Grant and Andy Flower and Paul and Bryan Strang.

References

External links

1970 births
Living people
Zimbabwe Test cricketers
Zimbabwe One Day International cricketers
Zimbabwean cricketers
Mashonaland cricketers
Matabeleland cricketers
Sportspeople from Masvingo
White Zimbabwean sportspeople